is a song by Japanese rock band Ogre You Asshole and the title track of their second Mini Album released independently on November 5, 2008.

Track listing

References

2008 EPs
Ogre You Asshole albums